Champaner Road railway station is a small railway station in Panchmahal district, Gujarat. Its code is CPN. It serves Champaner village. The station consists of three platforms.

Trains 

The following trains run from Champaner Road railway station:

 Vadodara–Kota Passenger
 Vadodara–Dahod MEMU
 Bandra Terminus-Dehradun Express
 Vadodara–Godhra MEMU

References 

Railway stations in Panchmahal district
Vadodara railway division